Mohammad Jawed Omar Belim (born 25 November 1976), known in the early days of his career by the nickname Gullu is a former Bangladeshi cricketer who has played Tests and ODI cricket since 1995, and a former captain in both formats. Jawed bid bye after a friendly domestic match on January 3, 2014.

Trivia
On his Test debut in April 2001, he carried his bat for 85 not out becoming only the third player in history to achieve this on debut. He is the second person in the history to carry the bat through entire innings in both forms of cricket. Moreover, he is one of the twenty two cricketers in the history of 137 years of test cricket who scored half centuries in both innings of a test as a debutant. The opener has gained a reputation for being able to occupy the crease as his Test strike rate of 36 shows. On 28 August 2003, Jawed scored his maiden Test century against Pakistan.

During the second Test between Bangladesh and India in May 2007 he achieved the very rare feat of grabbing a king pair as he got out to the bowling of Zaheer Khan in the first ball of both innings of the Test Match.

Early years
Still in his early teens, Jawed toured England during the summer of 1989 with the Bangladesh U-19 side.
Later that year, he played in the Asian U-19 cup in Afghanistan and scored 55 in the match against Pakistan.

The transformation from the youth team to the national side, however, took a bit of time, and it was not until the 1994–95 season that he got his chance in the national colours. This delay was partly because during the period 90–94 Bangladesh was mainly involved with One-Day Cricket while Jawed's batting technique is always more suitable for the longer version. Jawed was part of the team that won the ICC Trophy in 1997. However, he spent most of the tournament as a reserve player, as the coach Gordon Greenidge decided to push hard hitting middle-order bat Naimur Rahman to the opening position.

References

External links
 

1976 births
Living people
Bangladesh One Day International cricketers
Bangladesh Test cricketers
Bangladeshi cricketers
20th-century Bangladeshi cricketers
21st-century Bangladeshi cricketers
Dhaka Division cricketers
Cricketers from Dhaka
Biman Bangladesh Airlines cricketers
Barisal Division cricketers